The Networks of Mediterranean Youth (NET-MED Youth) (2014-2017) was a three-year project implemented by UNESCO and funded by the European Union for young people in the Mediterranean area of Europe.

Goal 
Networks of Mediterranean Youth, Its goals were to improve youth employment and youth civic participation by empowering youth organizations to deal with  national governments national media and regional media.

Beneficiaries 
 Youth organizations from 10 countries along the eastern and western basins of the Mediterranean Sea
 Youth, skills development and employment stakeholders (ministries, public institutions, social partners, and others)
 Media professionals, citizen journalists and bloggers

Reason for NET-MED

The project came as a response to the common challenges shared by Southern Mediterranean countries related to the social inclusion of youth. These include, among others, disinterest in civic engagement; insufficient representation in public and political spheres, as well as in mainstream media; high unemployment and a particularly weak participation of women in the labour market.

Focus areas of  NET-MED 

 Dynamic mappings of youth organizations
 National consultative working groups on key themes: Public Policy on Youth, Youth and Media, Youth and Employment
 Situational analysis of youth and national stakeholders, including legal and political frameworks
 Capacity building among youth organizations and ministries
 Formulation of and advocacy for national action plans on youth
 Monitoring of youth's representation in media, and surveying of youth's opinion about media
 Outreach actions fostering youth-friendly, inclusive, objective and fair media coverage
 Trainings and resources to promote freedom of expression, media and information literacy, production of media content by youth
 Capacity building among young journalists, bloggers and citizen journalists
 National and regional situational analysis reports on labour market, youth transition and data availability challenges 
 Development of tools for skills anticipation in close collaboration with national stakeholders 
 Capacity building among youth organizations for better involvement of youth in evidence-based policy design.

References 

UNESCO